"Bésame" (English: "Kiss Me") is a song by Mexican pop/rock group Camila, released on August 2, 2010, as the third single from their second album, Dejarte de Amar (2010). "Bésame" was written by Mario Domm, Mónica Vélez and produced by Domm. The song reached number one on the US Billboard Latin Pop Airplay charts.

Charts

Certifications

Release history

See also
List of number-one songs of 2010 (Mexico)
List of number-one Billboard Hot Latin Pop Airplay of 2011

References

2010 singles
Songs written by Mario Domm
Camila (band) songs
Monitor Latino Top General number-one singles
Spanish-language songs
Sony Music Latin singles
2010 songs
Songs written by Mónica Vélez
Pop ballads
Rock ballads